Crown glass is a type of optical glass used in lenses and other optical components. It has relatively low refractive index (≈1.52) and low dispersion (with Abbe numbers around 60). Crown glass is produced from alkali-lime silicates containing approximately 10% potassium oxide and is one of the earliest low dispersion glasses.

As well as the specific material named crown glass, there are other optical glasses with similar properties that are also called crown glasses. Generally, this is any glass with Abbe numbers in the range 50 to 85. For example, the borosilicate glass Schott BK7 (Schott designates it as 517642. The first three digits tell you its refractive index (1.517) and the last three tell you its Abbé number (64.2)) is an extremely common crown glass, used in precision lenses. Borosilicates contain about 10% boric oxide, have good optical and mechanical characteristics, and are resistant to chemical and environmental damage. Other additives used in crown glasses include zinc oxide, phosphorus pentoxide, barium oxide, fluorite and lanthanum oxide.

BAK-4 barium crown glass (Schott designates it as 569560. The first three digits tell you its refractive index (1.569) and the last three tell you its Abbé number (56.0)),has a higher index of refraction than BK7, and is used for prisms in high-end binoculars. In that application, it gives better image quality and a round exit pupil.

A concave lens of flint glass is commonly combined with a convex lens of crown glass to produce an achromatic doublet. The dispersions of the glasses partially compensate for each other, producing reduced chromatic aberration compared to a singlet lens with the same focal length.

See also
History of the achromatic telescope
John Dollond, who patented and commercialised the crown/flint doublet

Notes

External links
 Crown glass article
Applied photographic optics Book
Book- The properties of optical glass
  Handbook of Ceramics, Glasses, and Diamonds
 Optical glass construction
 Video of blowing crown glass by Corning Museum of Glass

Glass compositions